HD 115088, also known as HIP 64951, is a star located in the southern circumpolar constellation Chamaeleon. It has an apparent magnitude of 6.33, placing it near the limit for naked eye visibility. Based on parallax measurements from the Gaia spacecraft, the object is estimated to be 412 light years distant. At that distance, its brightness is diminished by 0.37 magnitudes due to interstellar dust.

HD 115088 has a stellar classification of B9.5/A0 V — intermediate between a B9.5 and A0 main sequence star. It has 2.85 times the mass of the Sun and double the radius of the Sun. It is estimated to be 244 million years old, having completed 52.5% of its main sequence lifetime.

References

B-type main-sequence stars
A-type main-sequence stars
115088
064951
CD-79 00519
Chamaeleontis, 45
Chamaeleon (constellation)